The RAF Fauld explosion was a military accident which occurred at 11:11am on Monday, 27 November 1944 at the RAF Fauld underground munitions storage depot in Staffordshire, England. It was one of the largest non-nuclear explosions in history and the largest on UK soil.

Between  of ordnance exploded, mostly high explosives. The crater is still visible just south of Fauld, to the east of Hanbury, Staffordshire. It is now known as the Hanbury Crater.

A nearby reservoir containing  of water was obliterated in the incident, along with several buildings including a complete farm. Flooding caused by the destruction of the reservoir added to the damage caused by the explosion.

The exact death toll is uncertain; it is believed that about 70 people died in the explosion and resulting flood.

Cause

The cause of the disaster was not made clear at the time, as the British government did not want enemy governments and military to know the extent of the disaster. There had been staff shortages, a management position had remained empty for a year, and 189 inexperienced Italian prisoners of war were working in the mines at the time of the accident. There were also equipment shortages, a lack of worker training, multiple agencies in the mine resulting in a lack of an organised chain of command, and pressure from British government and military to increase work speed for the war effort which resulted in safety regulations being overlooked.  In 1974, it was announced that the cause of the explosion was probably a site worker removing a detonator from a live bomb using a brass chisel, rather than a wooden batten, resulting in sparks. An eyewitness testified that he had seen a worker using brass chisels, in direct contravention of the regulations in force.

Effects
No. 21 Maintenance Unit RAF Bomb Storage dump consisted of old gypsum mine workings which had been made into storage for a variety of ordnance; in addition to shells and bombs, the specifications included several types of weapons and up to 500 million rounds of small arms ammunition. Up to  exploded, including  of bombs packed with high explosives. At 11:15 hours on 27 November 1944, two huge explosions took place at the dump. Eyewitnesses reported seeing two distinct columns of black smoke in the form of a mushroom cloud ascending several thousand feet, and a blaze at the foot of the column. According to the commanding officer of 21 M.U., Group Captain Storrar, an open dump of incendiary bombs caught fire and it was allowed to burn itself out without damage or casualties.

Upper Castle Hayes Farm completely disappeared and Messrs. Peter Ford's lime and gypsum works to the north of the village and Purse cottages were demolished. The lime works was destroyed by the flooding after the destruction of the reservoir dam. Hanbury Fields Farm, Hare Holes Farm and also Croft Farm with adjacent cottages were all extensively damaged. Debris also damaged Hanbury village.

Casualties
At the time, no precise records were kept monitoring the exact number of workers at the facility. While the exact death toll is uncertain as a result of this, it appears that about 70 people died in the explosion. The official report stated that 90 were killed, missing or injured, including:
 26 killed or missing at the RAF dump—divided between RAF personnel, civilian workers and some Italian prisoners of war who were working there—5 of whom were gassed by toxic fumes; 10 were also severely injured. Six are buried in military graves. 
 37 killed (drowned) or missing at Peter Ford & Sons gypsum mine and plaster mill, and surrounding countryside; 12 also injured.
 Approximately 7 farm workers at the nearby Upper Castle Hayes Farm.
 One diver was killed during search and rescue operations.

The inscription on the memorial stone that was erected at the crater in November 1990, lists a total of 70 names of people who died as a result of the explosion, 18 of these names are people who are still missing and presumed dead.

Two hundred cattle were also killed by the explosion. Some live cattle were removed from the vicinity, but were found dead the following morning.

Aftermath

A relief fund organised by the local people made payments to victims and their families until 1959.

Much of the storage facility was annihilated by the explosion, but the site itself continued to be used by the RAF for munitions storage until 1966, when No. 21 Maintenance Unit was disbanded. Following France's withdrawal from NATO's integrated military structure in 1966, the site was used by the United States Army between 1967 and 1973 to store US ammunition previously stored in France.

By 1979, the site was fenced off, and the area is now covered with over 150 species of trees and wildlife. Access is restricted as a significant amount of explosives are still buried deep in the site; the UK government has deemed their removal too expensive to be feasible.

On 13 September 1990, 46 years after the initial incident, it was announced that a memorial stone was to be erected to commemorate those who died, to be paid for by the public, as Hanbury Parish Council did not have the necessary funds. The stone used for the memorial was donated by the Italian government and flown to the United Kingdom on an RAF plane. It was unveiled on 25 November 1990. A second memorial was dedicated on the 70th anniversary of the explosion, 27 November 2014. A tourist trail leads to the crater from the Cock Inn pub in Hanbury, which was damaged by debris from the explosion.

The maintenance unit was the subject of several paintings under the collective title "the bomb store" by David Bomberg, who was briefly employed as a war artist by the War Ministry in 1943.

See also
 List of United Kingdom disasters by death toll
 RAF munitions storage during WWII

References

Further reading
 "Britain's big bang" by Peter Grego, Astronomy Now, November 2004. .
 McCamley, N.J. (1998). Secret Underground Cities. Barnsley: Leo Cooper. .
 McCamley, N.J. (2004). Disasters Underground. Barnsley: Pen & Sword Military. .
 Grid Reference: SK182277
 Hardy, Valerie. (2015). Voices from the Explosion: RAF Fauld, the World's Largest Accidental Blast, 1944. Dark River. 
 McCamley, N.J. (2015). The Fauld Disaster 27 November 1944. Monkton Farleigh: Folly Books. 

1944 disasters in the United Kingdom
1944 in England
1944 in military history
20th century in Staffordshire
20th-century military history of the United Kingdom
disasters in Staffordshire
explosions in 1944
explosions in England
history of the Royal Air Force during World War II
military history of Staffordshire
November 1944 events